Moni Bhattacharjee was an Indian film director and screenwriter of the 1960s who directed Hindi language films.

Career
Bhattacharjee started as an assistant to Bimal Roy on many classic films of the 1950s. After the success of the film Madhumati (1958), Bimal Roy asked him to direct Usne Kaha Tha, which Roy produced under Bimal Roy Productions label, thus starting Bhattacharjee's career as a fully fledged director.  However, Usne Kaha Tha itself was a "none too smooth takeoff".  Bhattacharjee went on to direct numerous films, and is best known for the dacoit film, Mujhe Jeene Do (1963), which starred Sunil Dutt and Waheeda Rehman and was among the "Official Selection" at the 1964 Cannes Film Festival.

The Hindu praised Mujhe Jeene Do, writing that the "brilliant synthesis of script, photography, music, lyrics, acting and direction sends you on an emotional rollercoaster".  The Illustrated Weekly of India stated that Bhattacharjee was "groomed in the Bimal Roy school", and that his first directorial efforts were not as successful as Mujhe Jeene Do, which "placed him in the top flight of young directors".  Of Mujhe Jeene Do, The Link wrote: "The moral of the film is legion, and the acting impeded by Moni Bhattacharjee's confused direction. Only one thing is left. Does it, in all its humbling messiness, ever touch the heart?"

More recently, in 2010, Mujhe Jeene Do was described as a "classic" by The Hindu newspaper.

Filmography

Awards and nominations
 1964, nominated for Palme d'Or at Cannes Film Festival for Mujhe Jeene Do

References

External links
 

Film directors from Mumbai
Hindi-language film directors
Indian male screenwriters
Living people
20th-century Indian film directors
Bengali film directors
Bengali screenwriters
Year of birth missing (living people)